Northeastern Technical College is a public community college in Cheraw, South Carolina with branches in Pageland, Dillon, and Bennettsville. The college primarily serves Chesterfield, Marlboro, and Dillon counties. It is part of the South Carolina Technical College System.

Northeastern Technical College is accredited by the Commission on Colleges of the Southern Association of Colleges and Schools to award associate degrees, diplomas, and certificates. As with many other 2-year institutions, Northeastern offers transfer programs to multiple Universities in South Carolina including Francis Marion University, University of South Carolina, Clemson University, Coker College, Lander University, South Carolina State University, Winthrop University and Kaplan College

Demographics
Northeastern Technical College has 894 enrolled students as of Spring semester 2017. The campus is diverse; 54% of students are White/Non-Hispanic, 43% are Black/Non-Hispanic, 1% are Native American and 1% are Asian.

References

External links

Education in Chesterfield County, South Carolina
Education in Marlboro County, South Carolina
Education in Dillon County, South Carolina
Buildings and structures in Chesterfield County, South Carolina
South Carolina Technical College System